The Anna Karenina principle states that a deficiency in any one of a number of factors dooms an endeavor to failure. Consequently, a successful endeavor (subject to this principle) is one for which every possible deficiency has been avoided.

The name of the principle derives from Leo Tolstoy's 1877 novel Anna Karenina, which begins:

 

In other words: happy families share a common set of attributes which lead to happiness, while any of a variety of attributes can cause an unhappy family. This concept has been generalized to apply to several fields of study.

In statistics, the term Anna Karenina principle is used to describe significance tests: there are any number of ways in which a dataset may violate the null hypothesis and only one in which all the assumptions are satisfied.

Examples

Failed domestication
The Anna Karenina principle was popularized by Jared Diamond in his 1997 book Guns, Germs and Steel. Diamond uses this principle to illustrate why so few wild animals have been successfully domesticated throughout history, as a deficiency in any one of a great number of factors can render a species undomesticable. Therefore, all successfully domesticated species are not so because of a particular positive trait, but because of a lack of any number of possible negative traits. In chapter 9, six groups of reasons for failed domestication of animals are defined:
 Diet – To be a candidate for domestication, a species must be easy to feed. Finicky eaters make poor candidates. Non-finicky omnivores make the best candidates.
 Growth rate – The animal must grow fast enough to be economically feasible. Elephant farmers, for example, would wait perhaps twelve years for their herd to reach adult size.
 Captive breeding – The species must breed well in captivity. Species having mating rituals prohibiting breeding in a farm-like environment make poor candidates for domestication. These rituals could include the need for privacy or long, protracted mating chases.
 Disposition – Some species are too ill-tempered to be good candidates for domestication. Farmers must not be at risk of life or injury every time they enter the animal pen. The zebra is of special note in the book, as it was recognized by local cultures and Europeans alike as extremely valuable and useful to domesticate, but it proved impossible to tame. Horses in Africa proved to be susceptible to disease and attack by a wide variety of animals, while the very characteristics that made the zebra hardy and survivable in the harsh environment of Africa also made it fiercely independent.
 Tendency to panic – Species are genetically predisposed to react to danger in different ways. A species that immediately takes flight is a poor candidate for domestication. A species that freezes, or mingles with the herd for cover in the face of danger, is a good candidate. Deer in North America have proven almost impossible to domesticate and have difficulty breeding in captivity. In contrast, horses thrived from when they were re-introduced to North America in the sixteenth century.
 Social structure – Species of lone, independent animals make poor candidates. A species that has a strong, well-defined social hierarchy is more likely to be domesticated. A species that can imprint on a human as the head of the hierarchy is best. Different social groups must also be tolerant of one another.

Ecological risk assessment

Ecologist Dwayne Moore describes applications of the Anna Karenina principle in ecology:

Aristotle's version
Much earlier, Aristotle states the same principle in the Nicomachean Ethics (Book 2):

Order in chaos of maladaptation
Many experiments and observations of groups of humans, animals, trees, grassy plants, stockmarket prices, and changes in the banking sector proved the modified Anna Karenina principle.

This effect is proved for many systems: from the adaptation of healthy people to a change in climate conditions to the analysis of fatal outcomes in oncological and cardiological clinics. The same effect is found in the stock market. The applicability of these two statistical indicators of stress, simultaneous increase of variance and correlations, for diagnosis of social stress in large groups was examined in the prolonged stress period preceding the 2014 Ukrainian economic and political crisis. There was a simultaneous increase in the total correlation between the 19 major public fears in the Ukrainian society (by about 64%) and also in their statistical dispersion (by 29%) during the pre-crisis years.

General mathematical backgrounds
Vladimir Arnold in his book Catastrophe Theory describes "The Principle of Fragility of Good Things" which in a sense supplements the Principle of Anna Karenina: good systems must meet simultaneously a number of requirements; therefore, they are more fragile:

See also
O-ring theory of economic development

References

Principles
Statistical hypothesis testing